Doctor Ub'x is a fictional character in the DC Universe.  He first appeared disguised as the villain Polestar in Green Lantern Corps #201 (June 1986), then disguised as the villains Truk, Malignon, and his true form in Green Lantern Corps #202 (July 1986). Ub'x was named after the famed Walt Disney animator Ub Iwerks.

Fictional character biography

Pre-Crisis
Doctor Ub'x's pre-Crisis life was revealed in as a flashback in Green Lantern Corps #203 (August 1986).  Ub'x was born on H'lven, a planet located in Sector 1014 of the DC Universe. Ub'x resembles an anthropomorphic combination of a squirrel and a beaver.  Possessed of great intelligence and an equally great desire for power, Ub'x left his homeworld and created a powerful military force known as the "Crabster Army."  Under Ub'x's direction, this army conquered most of the planets in the sector and defeated the fox-like creature that was the Green Lantern of that region of space. Turning his attention to his homeworld, Ub'x easily defeated the peaceful inhabitants of H'lven and sentenced the leader of the resistance, Ch'p, to death.

Ch'p was visited in his cell by one of the Guardians of the Universe, who offered the heroic H'lvenite a Green Lantern power ring. Using the ring, Ch'p became the new Green Lantern of sector 1014 and swept Ub'x's forces from the planet. Defeated but unrepentant, Ub'x commenced a campaign to overcome his new adversary, engaging the Green Lantern in a series of battles to test Ch'p's abilities, and discovering Ch'p's secret identity.

Using his information, Ub'x kidnapped Ch'p's girlfriend and threatened to feed her to the terrible Borgul Bears unless the Green Lantern gave up his ring.  Ch'p gave in to the demand, but not before commanding the ring to capture Ub'x in a giant nutcracker at a later moment.  Defeated once again, Dr. Ub'x retreated to his well-guarded fortress to hatch a new plot.

Utilizing his powerful intelligence, Ub'x created a device designed to match the power of a Green Lantern. Dubbing the device the "Sucker Stick", Ub'x completed his work just as the "Crisis on Infinite Earths" struck his homeworld. Realizing that the timeline was being rewritten, Ub'x used the power of the Sucker Stick to keep himself from being erased from history.  The Sucker Stick converted his body into energy.

Post-Crisis
Ub'x eventually followed his nemesis Ch'p to Earth.  He was able to convert his energy form into copies of other supervillains, and engaged the members of the Green Lantern Corps.  Once he defeated the Green Lanterns, he was able to convert his body back into its original shape and prepared to kill Ch'p.  Before he could, he suddenly realized that Ch'p was the only remaining connection to his past. Unable to kill the Green Lantern, Ub'x lost control of his Sucker Stick and was almost erased from history, but Ch'p intervened to prevent his demise. The two former adversaries called a truce and eventually became friends.

Ub'x relocated to Africa where he began experiments to create a race of creatures similar to the rodent-like H'lvenites. Accompanying Ch'p on a mission to the future, Ub'x discovered that his experiments had succeeded, and decided to remain in the 58th century in order to aid the new species he had created (Green Lantern Corps #215, August 1987). With the subsequent revisions to the DC timeline, it is uncertain whether or not Ub'x or this alternate future continue to exist.

References

External links
Doctor Ub'x at the Unofficial Guide to the DC Universe

DC Comics supervillains
Characters created by Steve Englehart
Comics characters introduced in 1986
DC Comics extraterrestrial supervillains
DC Comics scientists